Borislav "Boro" Drljača (29 August 1941 – 11 October 2020) was a Serbian folk singer from Bosanska Krajina. Recognized as one of the most eminent Yugoslav folk singers, he received the Life Achievement Award for his work. Drljača recorded over four hundred songs including "Stari vuk" (Old Wolf), "Ne namiguj na me tuđa ženo" (Don't Wink at Me, Someone Else's Wife), and "Plači, mala, plači" (Cry, Baby, Cry). He also performed for Serbian diaspora across Europe, The United States, Canada and Australia.

In addition to his music career, Drljača also appeared on reality shows Veliki Brat VIP 4 (2010) and Parovi 4 (2015). Furthermore, he was a subject of numerous popular internet memes on social media.

Early life
Borislav Drljača was born on 29 August 1941 in the village of Donja Suvaja, former Kingdom of Yugoslavia into a Serb family during World War II. Drljača’s father Branko was an economist, store manager and a guitarist while his mother Stoja was also an economist. When he was two years old his mother died after being killed by Ustaše and his father later remarried after the war leaving him with no photographs of his mother. Drljača finished primary school in Donja Suvaja, after which he went to his uncle in Bačka Topola. He also finished agricultural high school there, Drljača eventually relocated to Belgrade to study agronomy at the University of Belgrade.

Personal life
Drljača was married twice. From his first marriage, with his late wife Verica Drljača, he has two sons: Vladimir, who has master’s degree management in Paris, and Branislav, who graduated in painting in Belgrade. Drljača had a hard time withstanding his first wife’s death because she committed suicide in 2006. Drljača met his second wife, Radomirka Sladić, at his concert. The couple did not have children and Sladić died from cancer in 2018.

On 11 October 2020 Drljača died from colon cancer in his New Belgrade apartment.

Discography
Albums
 1973 – Sarajevo divno mjesto (Sarajevo Lovely Place)
 1974 – Za ljubav tvoju (For Your Love)
 1975 – Ti si sve što želim (You Are All I Want)
 1976 – Krajišnici gdje ćemo na prelo (Krajišniks Where Do We Go for Some Fun)
 1978 – Pjevaj mi, pjevaj sokole (Sing to Me, Falcon)
 1980 – Bora i Gordana Runjajić (Bora and Gordana Runjajić)
 1981 – Bora Drljača (Bora Drljača)
 1982 – Jugosloven (The Yugoslav)
 1984 – Nas dvoje veže ljubav (A Love Binds Two of Us)
 1985 – Hitovi Jugodisk BDN 0661 (Jugodisk Hits BND 0661)
 1985 – Čovjek sam iz naroda (I Am a Man of the People)
 1986 – Pjevaj srce (Sing, Oh Heart of Mine)
 1988 – Alal vera majstore (Congratulations, Maestro)
 1990 – Ko te uze zlato moje (Who Took You, My Gold)
 1990/91 – Krajino, Krajino (Krajina, Oh Krajina)
 1991 – Ja sam čovek za tebe (I Am the Man for You)
 1991 – Ne dam Krajine (I Will Not Give Up Krajina)
 1995 – Nema raja bez rodnoga kraja (There is No Paradise Without Homeland)
 1996 – Krajišnik sam ja (I Am a Guy from Krajina)
 1998 – Sine sine (Son, Oh My Son)
 1999 – Rača II (Raca II)
 2002 – Car ostaje car (Emperor Remains Emperor)
 2004 – Bora Drljača uživo (Bora Drljača Live)
 2004 – Stari vuk (Old Wolf)
 2007 – Brbljivica (Gossip Girl)

See also
Music of Serbia
Serbian folk music
Culture of Serbia

Notes

References

External links
 

1941 births
2020 deaths
People from Bosanska Krupa
Serbs of Bosnia and Herzegovina
20th-century Serbian male singers
Serbian folk singers
Grand Production artists
Bosnia and Herzegovina emigrants to Serbia
Serbian turbo-folk singers
Parovi
Deaths from cancer in Serbia
Yugoslav male singers
21st-century Serbian male singers